Milan Folta (born 7 November 1960 in Prešov) is a Slovak former handball player who competed in the 1988 Summer Olympics and in the 1992 Summer Olympics.

References

1960 births
Living people
Czechoslovak male handball players
Slovak male handball players
Olympic handball players of Czechoslovakia
Handball players at the 1988 Summer Olympics
Handball players at the 1992 Summer Olympics
Sportspeople from Prešov